Deer Creek is a stream in Monroe County in the U.S. state of Missouri. It is a tributary of the North Fork Salt River.

Deer Creek was so named on account of deer near its course.

See also
List of rivers of Missouri

References

Rivers of Monroe County, Missouri
Rivers of Missouri